This article outlines the defence forces of the European Union (EU), which implement the EU's Common Security and Defence Policy (CSDP) in CSDP missions. There are two categories of EU multinational forces: ones that have been established intergovernmentally and made available to the CSDP through article 42.3 of the Treaty on European Union (TEU), such as the Eurocorps; and the EU Battlegroups, established at the EU level.

EU military or crisis operations

The military operations of the EU are typically named with a prefix that is either European Union Force (EUFOR) or European Union Naval Force (NAVFOR), depending on whether the operation is terrestrial or at sea. The suffix is typically the area in which the operation took place, e.g. European Naval Force Mediterranean (EUNAVFOR MED). The operations therefore have unique names, although the force may also consist of permanent multinational forces such as the European Corps.

Pre-organised forces

The Helsinki Headline Goal Catalogue is a listing of rapid reaction forces composed of 60,000 troops managed by the European Union, but under control of the countries who deliver troops for it. The Headline Goal 2010 was its successor.

Forces introduced at Union level include:

EU Battlegroups 

The EU Battlegroups (BG) adhere to the CSDP, and are based on contributions from a coalition of member states. Each of the eighteen Battlegroups consists of a battalion-sized force (1,500 troops) reinforced with combat support elements. The groups rotate actively, so that two are ready for deployment at all times. The forces are under the direct control of the Council of the European Union. The Battlegroups reached full operational capacity on 1 January 2007, although, as of November 2018, they have yet to see any military action. Based on existing ad hoc missions which the European Union (EU) has undertaken, they have been described by some as a new "standing army" for Europe.

The troops and equipment are drawn from the EU member states under a "lead nation". In 2004, United Nations Secretary-General Kofi Annan welcomed the plans and emphasised the value and importance of the Battlegroups in helping the UN deal with troublespots.

European Medical Corps 

The European Medical Corps (EMC) is an incident response team that was launched on  15 February 2016 by the European Union to provide an emergency response force to deal with outbreaks of epidemic disease anywhere in the world. The EMC was formed after the 2014 Ebola outbreak in West Africa when the WHO was criticized for a slow  and insufficient response in the early stages of the Ebola outbreak. The EMC is part of the  emergency response capacity of European countries. Teams from nine EU member states—Belgium, Luxembourg, Spain, Germany, the Czech Republic, France, the Netherlands, Finland, and Sweden — are available for deployment in an emergency. The EMC consist of medical teams, public health teams, mobile biosafety laboratories, medical evacuation capacities, experts in public health and medical assessment and coordination, and technical and logistics support. Any country in need of assistance can make a request to Emergency Response Coordination Centre, part of the European Commission's Humanitarian Aid and Civil Protection department. The first deployment of the EMC was announced by the European Commissioner for Humanitarian Aid and Civil Protection on 12 May 2016, a response to the outbreak of yellow fever in Angola in 2016. An earlier concept of an emergency medical response team was Task Force Scorpio formed by the United Nations during the first Gulf War.

European Medical Command

The European Medical Command (EMC) is a planned medical command centre in support of EU missions, formed as part of the Permanent Structured Cooperation (PESCO). The EMC will provide the EU with a permanent medical capability to support operations abroad, including medical resources and a rapidly deployable medical task force. The EMC will also provide medical evacuation facilities, triage and resuscitation, treatment and holding of patients until they can be returned to duty, and emergency dental treatment. It will also contribute to harmonising medical standards, certification and legal (civil) framework conditions.

Crisis Response Operation Core

EUFOR Crisis Response Operation Core (EUFOR CROC) is a flagship defence project under development as part of the Permanent Structured Cooperation (PESCO) facility. EURFOR CROC will contribute to the creation of a "full spectrum force package" to speed up provision of military forces and the EU's crisis management capabilities. Rather than creating a standing force, the project involves creating a concrete catalogue of military force elements that would speed up the establishment of a force when the EU decides to launch an operation. It is land-focused and aims to generate a force of 60,000 troops from the contributing states alone. While it does not establish any form of "European army", it foresees an deployable, interoperable force under a single command. Germany is the lead country for the project, but the French are heavily involved and it is tied to President Emmanuel Macron's proposal to create a standing intervention force. The French see it as an example of what PESCO is about.

Rapid Deployment Capacity

A permanent European Union Rapid Deployment Capacity (EU RDC) consisting of up to 5,000 troops (the size of a brigade) is to be operational by 2025. During the German EU presidency in the second half of 2020, the EU Common Security and Defence Policy began development of the Strategic Compass for Security and Defence, as of November 2021 envisioning a large intervention force described as 'substantially modified EU battlegroups' of 5,000 soldiers by 2025.

Provided through the Treaty of European Union
 

This section presents an incomplete list of forces and bodies established intergovernmentally amongst subsets of Member states of the European Union.

These multinational organizations may also be deployed either in a NATO environment, through the EU, acting upon the mandate of the participating countries, or acting upon the mandate of other international organisations, such as United Nations, or the Organization for Security and Co-operation in Europe.

Land forces:
The European Corps (Eurocorps) is an army corps whose headquarters numbers approximately 1,000 soldiers, and is stationed in Strasbourg, France. The Franco-German Brigade is associated with the corps.
The I. German/Dutch Corps is a multinational formation consisting of units from the Dutch and German armies. Due to its role as a NATO High Readiness Forces Headquarters, soldiers from other NATO member states, the United States, Denmark, Norway, Spain, Italy, the United Kingdom amongst others, are also stationed at Münster.
 The Multinational Corps Northeast, a multinational corps established via a Danish-German-Polish corps convention, is a NATO-affiliated force
 The European Gendarmerie Force, abbreviated EUROGENDFOR or EGF, is an intervention force with militarised police functions and specialisation in crisis management.
Air forces:
The European Air Transport Command (EATC) is the command centre that exercises the operational control of the majority of the aerial refueling capabilities and military transport fleets of the seven participating nations. Located at Eindhoven Airbase in the Netherlands, the command also bears a limited responsibility for exercises, aircrew training and the harmonisation of relevant national air transport regulations. The command was established in 2010 with a view to provide a more efficient management of the participating nations' assets and resources in this field.
Lithuanian–Polish–Ukrainian Brigade (LITPOLUKRBRIG), a tri-lateral agreement to operate NATO, EU and UN tasks. 

Naval forces:
The European Maritime Force (EUROMARFOR or EMF) is a non-permanent, military force that may carry out naval, air and amphibious operations, with an activation time of five days after an order is received. The force was formed in 1995 to fulfill missions defined in the Petersberg Declaration, such as sea control, humanitarian missions, peacekeeping operations, crisis response operations, and peace enforcement.

Multi-component:
The Combined Joint Expeditionary Force (CJEF), is a Franco-British military force. It draws upon both the British Armed Forces and the French Armed Forces to field a deployable force with land, air and maritime components together with command and control and supporting logistics. It is distinct from the similarly named UK Joint Expeditionary Force. The Combined Joint Expeditionary Force (or CJEF) is envisaged as a deployable, combined Franco-British military force for use in a wide range of crisis scenarios, up to and including high intensity combat operations. As a joint force it involves all three armed Services: a land component composed of formations at national brigade level, maritime and air components with their associated Headquarters, together with logistics and support functions. The CJEF is not conceived as a standing force but rather as available at notice for UK-French bilateral, NATO, European Union, United Nations or other operations. Combined air and land exercises commenced during 2011 with a view towards developing a full capability. The CJEF is also seen as a potential stimulus towards greater interoperability and coherence in military doctrine, training and equipment requirements.

Member state participation in various force-related organisations

See also

Permanent Structured Cooperation
Helsinki Headline Goal
European Border and Coast Guard Agency
List of military and civilian missions of the European Union

Notes

References

External links
EU takes steps toward joint army